The 2011 Women's Hockey Champions Challenge II was held from May 7–15, 2011 in Vienna, Austria. Belgium beat Italy 2–1 to win the tournament and promoted to 2012 Champions Challenge I.

Results
All times are Central European Time (UTC+01:00)

First round

Pool A

Pool B

Second round

Quarterfinals

Fifth to eighth place classification

Crossover

Seventh and eighth place

Fifth and sixth place

First to fourth place classification

Semifinals

Third and fourth place

Final

Awards

Statistics

Final ranking

References

External links
Official FIH website

Women's Hockey Champions Challenge II
Champions Challenge II
Hockey Champions Challenge II Women
International women's field hockey competitions hosted by Austria
Sports competitions in Vienna
Hockey Champions Challenge II Women